The IEEE Industry Standards and Technology Organization (ISTO) is a 501(c)(6) non profitable federation of industry alliances, consortia, and trade groups. Formed in 1999, ISTO has an affiliation with the Institute of Electrical and Electronics Engineers - a separate legal and autonomous entity incorporated in the State of Delaware, USA.

ISTO offers industry associations, trade groups, and consortia a means to form technical organizations - and a vehicle to develop specifications, promote technologies and gain market acceptance. ISTO works with collective startups and had established entities alike to provide the legal infrastructure, operational support and tools required to accomplish specific goals.

By contracting to join the ISTO federation, alliances and other collective startups are able to form a legal and autonomous not-for-profit collective entity. ISTO’s legal infrastructure offloads from member alliances the annual obligations of entity insurance coverage, annual financial audits and annual tax filings. On a daily basis, ISTO provides operational support to its member programs.

IEEE-ISTO History 
In January 1999, after eighteen months of planning and development, an IEEE press release announced the formation of a new, independent, not-for-profit corporation named the IEEE Industry Standards and Technology Organization (ISTO).

The formation of the ISTO was approved by the IEEE Board of Directors in November 1998, based upon a five-year business plan. The goal of the ISTO was to provide a link between standards development activity in informal consortia and the formal standards activities of the IEEE. By offering a wide variety of management, operational and technical support to industry participants setting specifications outside of the traditional process used by SDOs (standards development organizations) like the IEEE Standards Association, the ISTO would meet an industry need while maintaining an affiliation with IEEE.

When the ISTO was formed, the IEEE was the sole founding member. IEEE provided the ISTO with a line of credit to fund initial operations which was repaid years later as ISTO continued to grow. The ISTO headquarters was located within the IEEE Operations Center in Piscataway, NJ.

In 2000, the ISTO Staff and the Board of Directors undertook a marketing and promotion campaign which resulted in the Medical Device Communications Industry Group (MDCIG), the Printer Working Group (PWG), and the Nexus5001 Forum becoming the first three programs of ISTO.

As the year 2000 drew to a close, the number of Programs supported by the ISTO had grown to eight [VoiceXML Forum, MessageML, SyncML, the Broadband Wireless internet Forum (BWIF) and the 1355 Association].

The concept of the ISTO as an umbrella organization under which industry standards activities could be performed efficiently and successfully had been demonstrated and the opportunities for new Programs continued to grow. The addition of three more Programs in 2001 [Customized learning Experience Online (CLEO) lab, Wireless Village and Mobile Games Interoperability Forum (MGIF)] brought the number of Programs to eleven.

With the ongoing increase of new ISTO programs over the years, it became necessary to add staff resources and tools to provide professional support.

Market Adoptions 

The staff give advice on strategic and tactical program management, ISTO has cooperated with over 50 industry alliances and trade groups and worked on these technologies:

 Telecom/mobile interfaces
 Internet of things
 High performance computing
 Wireless power charging
 Datacenter networks optimization
 Blockchain technology
 eHealth
 Integrated voice response
 Electronic design automation (EDA)
 Lighting
 Smart cities

Support Offering 
ISTO offers the following:
 Legal Infrastructure (including Tax, Audit, and Insurance obligations)
 Strategic Consulting and Program Management 
 Open Source and Alliance Management Tooling 
 Standardization and Certification Programs 
 Financial/Accounting Management 
 Membership Administration 
 Contract Administration 
 Event Planning and Management 
 PR and Marketing Communications 
 Legal Registrations, Licensing, Compliance

Legal Infrastructure (including Tax, Audit, Insurance obligations) 

Infrastructure – ISTO's legal framework enables its not-for-profit legal status to be shared with its member alliances. ISTO also fulfills IRS obligations for member alliances as it includes member alliances in its annual financial audit and annual tax filing.

Liability Insurance/Indemnification – ISTO carries a comprehensive package of insurance policies (renewed annually) to cover all member alliances organized under its legal umbrella. Coverage includes policy clauses such as Directors and Officers (D&O), Errors and Omissions (E&O) and general liability.

ISTO Membership – The ISTO Federation allows for member programs to participate in cross-program activities such as ISTO Program Leadership Caucuses, the ISTO Annual Member Meeting and the nomination and election of ISTO Director candidates.

Independent Formation – ISTO manages the self-incorporation of member alliances and oversees the submission and filing of IRS Form 1024 for member alliances to apply for not-for-profit status. ISTO is knowledgeable of all legal, tax and audit requirements for 501(c)(6) entities, and ensures legal compliance for new not-for-profit organizations.

Strategic Consulting and Program Management 

Formation Assistance – ISTO supports the formation of industry alliances, assisting with membership structures, mission statements, and Board formation as well as drafting governing documents including Bylaws, Intellectual Property Rights (IPR) policies and Membership Agreements. ISTO sets up bank accounts, financial statements, contract templates and develops brand identity.

Board Secretariat – ISTO serves as Board Secretariat for a number of organizations around the world.

Association Management– ISTO provides executive-level strategic and tactical support to meet organizational goals and committee/working group objectives, respectively.

Open Source and Alliance Management Tooling 

Membership Management Systems that are fully integrated with group calendaring, committee dashboards, eVoting modules, wikis, member rosters, email reflectors and secure document/ communications repositories
Collaboration tools to support remote meetings, online communities, user groups and online specifications development
Website hosting and content/domain management
Systems administration and development and management of databases, email programs, internal communications and other needs
Open source tools including open source repositories for code development and collaboration and other Web 2.0 tools
Media monitoring to measure news about member organizations and/or related technologies

Standardization and Certification Programs 

ISTO supports the setup and ongoing administration of various models for standardization, compliance/interoperability test programs, and licensing by its member alliances.

Financial/Accounting Management 

ISTO provides accounting and financial management support that adheres to GAAP (Generally Accepted Accounting Practice) and has received top ratings in its annual financial audit. ISTO supports daily AP/AR and invoicing requirements for member Programs as well as the annual obligations of financial audits and tax filings.

Membership & Contract Administration 

ISTO provides membership administration from recruitment to processing to retention, managing member relations and analyzing membership trends.

Event Planning and Management 

ISTO supports member meetings around the world and plans for high-profile symposiums and technical summits.

PR and Marketing Communications 

ISTO manages member alliance PR, social media, blogs, vlogs, e-newsletters, surveys, evaluations, webinars, white papers, webinars, member surveys, infographics, branded materials, and website and logo development.

Legal Registrations, Licensing, Compliance 

ISTO handles registrations a licensing of member Program IP.

Consortia